These are the results for the boys' doubles event at the 2010 Summer Youth Olympics.

Seeds

Draw

Final eight

Top half

Bottom half

References
Doubles draw

Tennis at the 2010 Summer Youth Olympics